Brian Blanchfield is an American poet and essayist.

Early life and education
He was born in Winston-Salem, North Carolina in 1973, and graduated from the University of North Carolina at Chapel Hill and Warren Wilson College MFA Program for Writers. He is the author of two books of poetry, Not Even Then (2004) and A Several World (2014), and a book of essays/autobiography, Proxies (2016).

Writings
A Several World was the 2014 recipient of the James Laughlin Award and was a longlist finalist for the National Book Award. The book takes its title from a 17th-century poem by Robert Herrick, and deals with questions about subjectivity and individuality versus the collective. Proxies is a collection of 24 single-subject essays that concludes with a 21-page rolling endnote, "Correction." In a starred review, Publishers Weekly noted that "in each entry Blanchfield picks a subject—foot washing, authorship, owls—and examines it from several angles until the connection between metaphysical principle and lived experience suddenly crystallizes, often producing an analogy as surprising as it is lovely."

Blanchfield's poems and essays have been published by The Nation, Harper's, BOMB, the Paris Review,  Brick, Conjunctions, Guernica, and other publications.

Professional activities
He has taught creative writing at the Pratt Institute, Otis College of Art and Design, the University of Montana, the University of Arizona, and the Iowa Writers' Workshop. He currently teaches as an associate professor at the University of Idaho.

In 2010 he became a poetry editor of Fence Magazine and in 2015-16 was guest editor of the PEN Poetry Series. He hosted and produced episodes 1-32 of Speedway and Swan, a poetry and music radio show on KXCI Community Radio in Tucson, Arizona.

Publications
 Proxies: Essays Near Knowing (Nightboat Books, 2016)
 A Several World (Nightboat Books, 2014)
 Not Even Then (University of California Press, 2004)

Chapbooks
 Correction. (Essay Press, 2016)
 The History of Ideas, 1973-2012 (Spork Press, 2013)

Honors and awards
 Whiting Award for Nonfiction (2016)
 George A. and Eliza Gardner Howard Foundation Fellowship (2015-2016)
 James Laughlin Award (2014) 
 National Book Award Longlist, Poetry

References

External links
 PEN America
 Academy of American Poets Author Page
 National Book Award
 Nightboat Books Author Page
 Editor Interview
 Speedway and Swan, KXCI

Living people
21st-century American poets
University of North Carolina alumni
University of Idaho faculty
1973 births
American LGBT writers
American male poets
American LGBT poets
21st-century American male writers
21st-century American LGBT people